Lorenzo Mambrini (born 3 July 1978) is an Italian football manager who serves as head coach of Cuban club Ciego de Ávila.

Career
Mambrini was appointed head coach of the Cuba national football team in 2017, a position he held until 2018. After that, in 2019, he was appointed head coach of Ciego de Ávila in the Campeonato Nacional de Fútbol de Cuba, where he now works.

He started playing for Benevento Calcio in 1994

References

External links
 Mambrini, il nostro uomo all'Avana: Cuba scopre il calcio
 Mambrini re di Cuba: "Per Fidel" 
 ESCLUSIVA TSD - Mister Lorenzo Mambrini: “Panama, Cuba e l’incontro con Fidel, mi han cambiato la vita. Aspetto l’occasione giusta per rimettermi in discussione” 
 «Ho vinto il campionato a Cuba. L'avevo promesso a Fidel» 
 Campione con la squadra di Fidel e ct di Cuba, Mambrini: 'Voglio allenare in Italia. A chi mi ispiro? Adoro Sarri' 
 Lorenzo Mambrini, desde Perugia hasta Santiago de Cuba 

1978 births
Living people
Italian footballers
Italian football managers
People from Città di Castello
Association football midfielders
S.S. Arezzo players
Serie D players
Cuba national football team managers
Italian expatriate football managers
Expatriate football managers in Cuba
Sportspeople from the Province of Perugia
Footballers from Umbria